Delhi Land & Finance (DLF Limited) is a commercial real estate developer. It was founded by Chaudhary Raghvendra Singh in 1946 and it is based in New Delhi, India. DLF developed residential colonies in Delhi such as, Model Town, Rajouri Garden, Krishna Nagar, South Extension, Greater Kailash, Kailash Colony, and Hauz Khas. DLF builds residential, office, and retail properties.

With the passage of Delhi Development Act in 1957, the local government assumed control of real estate development in Delhi and banned private real estate developers. As a result, DLF began acquiring land at a relatively low cost outside the area controlled by the Delhi Development Authority, in the district of Gurgaon, in the adjacent state of Haryana. In the mid-1970s, the company started developing their DLF City project at Gurgaon. Its plans included hotels, infrastructure and special economic zones-related development projects.

The company is headed by Kushal Pal Singh. Kushal Pal Singh, according to the Forbes listing of richest billionaires in 2020, is the 494th richest man in the world with a net worth of US$3.6 billion. The company's 2 billion IPO in July 2007 was India's biggest IPO in history.

As of 31 March 2012, the company had 1,380 square feet of leased retail space across the country. In 2013–14, it leased out 3 million sq ft of office space in India.

The complaint was lodged against DLF by buyers in its residential projects Belaire & Park Place, located in Gurgaon. In February 2015, the CCI ordered its investigative arm to probe two more projects of DLF in Gurgaon, namely, DLF Regal Gardens and DLF Skycourt.

History

DLF's first residential project was Krishna Nagar in East Delhi, which was completed in 1949. Subsequently, the company developed 21 colonies in Delhi, including Model Town, Rajouri Garden, Punjabi Bagh, South Extension, Greater Kailash, Kailash Colony and Hauz Khas.  The passage of Delhi Development Act in 1957 was the first serious challenge to company's growth. The Act meant that the government would assume control of all real estate development activities in the city.

As a result, DLF decided to move beyond Delhi and focused on the suburb of Gurgaon in Haryana. which had the potential for development of residential and commercial properties. As DLF started to acquire land under the leadership of Chairman K.P. Singh, Gurgaon embarked on a period of rapid growth.

The land purchase program adopted a humane approach so that the sellers do not feel short-changed. To this effect, DLF partnered with farmers so that they also got a share in profits. DLF acquired and created a land bank and then sold plots to buyers after demarcation. The profits from the sales were subsequently shared with farmers, which encouraged more farmers to come forward and partner with DLF.

A 58 crore deal was cancelled between DLF and Robert Vadra by IAS officer Ashok Khemka.

DLF climbs 4% as realty firm sells 292 luxury homes for Rs 1,800 crore.

Sponsorship

In 2008, DLF became the title sponsor of the Indian Premier League, a newly formed Twenty20 cricket league. The deal ended in the 2012 version of the season; wherein it was taken over by PepsiCo Inc.

Beyond buildings

Haryana Urban Development Authority (HUDA) and DLF, in a 50:50 joint venture, have completed work on a 16- lane, 10.5 km road network in Gurgaon. This stretch from NH8 Toll Plaza to Sector 55/56 in Gurgaon with six underpasses, one flyover and freeways has improved traffic management in the city. To create this infrastructure facility, DLF had engaged Parsons Brinckerhoff for project management consultancy and construction work had been awarded to IL&FS.

Constructed buildings

References

External links
 

Real estate companies established in 1946
Companies based in New Delhi
Real estate companies of India
Indian companies established in 1946
Companies listed on the National Stock Exchange of India
Companies listed on the Bombay Stock Exchange